Masketsi may refer to:

Lac-Masketsi, unorganized territory in the Mauricie region of Quebec, Canada
Lake Masketsi (Mékinac), source of the Tawachiche West River, located in Lac-Masketsi, Quebec